Leif Robert Sätter (born 8 August 1961) is a Swedish curler.

Teams

References

External links
 

Living people
1961 births
Swedish male curlers
20th-century Swedish people